Magnum Productions is an Egyptian media production company. Founded in 2017 by directors Ramy Imam and Hisham Tahseen, Magnum has produced several high-profile television series.

Company projects
Magnum signed several high-profile contracts early on with actors such as Adel Imam,> Ahmed Ezz, Amr Youssef, Yousra, as well as the writer Ahmed Khaled Tawfik. The company aimed to produce works for both domestic and export consumption.
Examples include:
 Imam's first series with the company was the drama Awalem Khafeya, which aired during Ramadan of 2018
 Youssef's debut with the company is the 2019 Ramadan soap Tayea
 Yousra features in a variety talk show entitled الموعد ("Appointment")
 Valentino was released in 2020, another Imam vehicle, this time a comedy

References

Film production companies of Egypt
Egyptian companies established in 2017